Leonard "Ace" Herman (1913–1971) was an American film editor and producer. During his career he edited over seventy films, generally at low-budget outfits such as Monogram Pictures where he worked for many years, often on series films such as the Corporal Rod Webb Northerns.

Selected filmography
 Moon Over Montana (1946)
Ginger (1946)
 Louisiana (1947)
 French Leave (1948)
 Docks of New Orleans (1948)
 Trail of the Yukon (1949)
 Yellow Fin (1951)
 Northwest Territory (1951)
 Desert Pursuit (1952)
 Northern Patrol (1953)
 Tangier Incident (1953)
 Jack Slade (1953)
 Trail Blazers (1953)
 Yukon Vengeance (1954)
 New Faces (1954)
 Las Vegas Shakedown (1955)
 Toughest Man Alive (1955)

References

Bibliography 
 Pitts, Michael R. Western Film Series of the Sound Era. McFarland, 2009.

External links 
 

1913 births
1971 deaths
American film editors
American film producers
People from Ohio
20th-century American businesspeople